Daniil Ivanovich Spivakovsky (August 28, 1969, Moscow) is a Russian film and theater actor, Honored Artist of Russia (2007).  Head of the workshop of Theatre faculty of the Moscow Institute of Television and Radio Broadcasting  Ostankino.

Biography 
Daniil Spivakovsky born into a family doctor of psychological sciences, professor of Moscow State University Alla Semyonovna Spivakovskaya (born 1947).

After high school in 1986, Daniil filed documents in the Moscow State University in the Department of Psychology, however, did not get one point in the first year could not do, he went to work as an orderly in a mental hospital. He enrolled in the following year, but then canceled the benefits for full-time students and first-year Spivakovsky drafted into the Soviet army.

He served two years in the Army Signal Corps in 1989, Daniel was restored at the institute. However, he has not forgotten his love of theater and friends went to the Student Theater of Moscow State University.

Spring for the company, he went with friends to enter the college theater. It turned out that it took just three theatrical high school, but he chose to study GITIS. Teachers Spivakovsky was Andrey Goncharov.

In the cinema since 1991. Since 1992, the actor works in the Mayakovsky Theatre.

Personal life 
 First wife —  actress Anna Ardova.
  Second wife —  Svetlana Spivakovskaya. Three children.

Creativity

Theatre
 1990 —  Rosencrantz and Guildenstern are dead by Tom Stoppard as Hamlet
 1991  —   Adventures of Buratino  by Aleksey Tolstoy and Bulat Okudzhava as Duremar
 1994 —  Victim Century by Alexander Ostrovsky as footman, senior footman
 1994 —  It's a Family Affair-We'll Settle It Ourselves by Alexander Ostrovsky as  Tishka 
 2012 —   Talents and Admirers  by Alexander Ostrovsky as  Meluzov

Filmography
 1991 —  Migrants as episode
 2001 —  Maroseyka 12 as engineer Lyova Beregovoy
 2002 —  Two Fates as Mark
 2004 —  My stepbrother Frankenstein as Pavel
 2005 —  Poor Relatives as Grisha Tsausaki
 2005 —  The Case of  Dead Souls as Pyotr Bobchinsky (TV)
 2005 —  Yesenin as   Vetlugin
 2007 —  1612 as Styopka-Podkova
 2008 —  My Husband —   Genius as Lev Landau (Award of the Academy of Russian Television TEFI —  for Best Actor)
 2008 —  Silver Samurai as  Emperor Peter III of Russia
 2008 —  The Inhabited Island as broadcaster
 2009 —  The Legend of Olga as Adolf Hitler
 2010 —  Tower as  owner Goldanskii
 2010 —  Burnt by the Sun 2 as commander of the crossing
 2011 —  Comrade Stalin as Mikhail Suslov
 2011 —  The PyraMMMid as Gutov
 2015 —  Jurisdiction as Bushkov
 2016 —  The Men and Women as Vozvyshaev
 2021 —  ''The Execution as Miron

References

External links

1969 births
Living people
Male actors from Moscow
Russian male film actors
Russian male television actors
20th-century Russian male actors
Honored Artists of the Russian Federation
21st-century Russian male actors
Russian Academy of Theatre Arts alumni